The 2012 Milton Keynes Council election took place on Thursday 3 May 2012 to elect members of Milton Keynes Unitary Council in Buckinghamshire, England. One third of the council – the 17 seats contested in the 2008 election – was up for election and the council, which totals 51 seats, was under no overall control in advance of and after the vote. 7 of the Conservative Party's 21 seats were up for election, 4 of the Liberal Democrats's 17, 2 of the Labour's 9 and all 4 Independents.

After the election, the composition of the council was:
Conservative 20 (–1)
Labour 16 (+7)
Liberal Democrat 15 (–2)
Others 0 (–4)

One Liberal Democrat had become independent between the 2011 and 2012 elections.

Election results

Ward results

References

2012 English local elections
2012
2010s in Buckinghamshire